The Tammann Commemorative Medal is awarded once a year and was established in remembrance of Gustav Heinrich Johann Apollon Tammann. It honors members of the Deutsche Gesellschaft für Materialkunde, who have made outstanding contributions to the field of materials research.

Awardees 

 1973 Heinrich Wollenberger
 1974 Hans Hillmann
 1975 Manfred Wilkens
 1976 Otmar Vöhringer
 1977 Werner Pepperhoff
 1978 Heinrich Mecking
 1979 Theodor Hehenkamp
 1980 Ulrich Heubner
 1981 Helmut Holleck
 1982 Friedrich Pfeifer
 1983 Sigfried Steeb
 1984 Christian Herzig
 1986 Rudolf Akeret
 1988 Florian Schubert
 1989 Hans Paul Hougardy
 1990 Herbert Stephan
 1991 Georg Grathwohl
 1992 Ernst-Theo Henig
 1993 Wolfgang Gust
 1994 Gerhard Inden
 1995 Gerhard Sauthoff
 1996 Hans Jürgen Grabke
 1997 Günter Lange
 1998 Hans-Georg Sockel 
 1999 Fritz Appel 
 2000 Gerhard K. Wolf 
 2001 Hans-Eckhardt Schaefer 
 2002 Dmitri Molodov 
 2004 Hermann Riedel 
 2005 Gunther Eggeler 
 2006 Stefanie Tschegg 
 2007 Jürgen Hirsch 
 2008 Rainer Schmid-Fetzer 
 2009 Reinhard Pippan 
 2011 Werner Skrotzki 
 2012 Ralf Riedel 
 2013 Ulrich Martin 
 2014 Peter Uggowitzer
 2015 Willem J. Quadakkers 
 2016 Birgit Skrotzki
 2017 Michael Zehetbauer
 2018 Robert Danzer
 2019 Jiří Svoboda
 2020 Christos G. Aneziris

References 

German science and technology awards
Awards established in 1973
Materials science awards
Research awards